This is a list of villages in Nalgonda district, Telangana state, India, organized alphabetically.

A–B 

 Ailapuram
 Akaram
 Anajipuram
 Anantharam
 Annareddy Guda
 Anneparthy
 Appajipeta
 Arjalabai
 B.Thurka Palle
 Bandasomaram
 Battugudem
 Bollepally
 Bottuguda
 Brahmanapally
 Buddaram

C–E 

 Chada
 Chakirala
 Chamapur
 Chandampally
 Chandupatla, Bhongir mandal
 Chandupatla, Nakrekal Mandal
 Chappidolla Gudem
 Cheemalakondur
 Chinna Kaparthy
 Chinnaravula Pally
 Chintapally
 Chityal
 Dandampally
 Devalamma Naagaram
 Donakal
 Duppelli
 Eklaskhanpet
 Ellagiri
 Ellambhavi

G–I 

 Gangasanipally
 Ganugabanda
 Garakunta palem
 Gollagudem
 Gorenkalapally
 Gudur
 Gundrampally
 Gurraladandi
 Gurrampode
 Haliya
 Hanumapur
 Inupamula
 Itukulapahad

J–L 

 Jaikesaram
 Jainepally
 Jameela Pet
 Jamepally
 Jangaon
 K. R. Puram
 Kadaparthy
 Kadirenigudem
 Kaisaram
 Kaithapuram
 Kapugallu
 Katepally
 Kattangur
 Keethavarigudem
 Kepal
 Kerchipally
 Keshavapuram
 Kethepally
 Khapuraipally
 Kokkireni
 Kondamadugu
 Kondapur
 Kondoor
 Kondrapole
 Kotamarthy
 Koyalagudem
 Lingojigudem

M 

 M.Turkapally
 Madgulapally
 Mall
 Mamidala
 Mandalapuram
 Mandholla Gudem
 Mangalpally
 Mannevaripampu
 Marriguda
 Marrigudem
 Marror
 Masidugudem
 Midhatana Palli
 Moripirala
 Mugdumpally
 Muthyalapally
 Mylaram

N–O 

 Nagireddypally
 Nampally
 Nancharipet
 Nandanam
 Nandapuram
 Narketpally
 Neernemula
 Nellibanda
 Nemergomula
 Nomula
 Ogode
 Ogulapur

P–R 

 Pacharlabodu Thanda
 Pagidipalli
 Palem
 Pallegudem
 Panagal
 Panthangi
 Pedda Adiserla Pally
 Peddavoora
 Peepalpahad
 Penchikalpahad
 Perur
 Pittampally
 Pothireddypally
 Pulicherla
 Pulipalupula
 Pullaigudem
 Raghunathapuram
 Rahimkhanpet
 Raipally
 Ramapuram
 Rangapur
 Rathipally
 Ratnavaram
 Ravipadu
 Reddibavi
 Reddinaikthanda
 Rudravelly

S–T 

 Saidabad
 Samalonibavi
 Sarvepally
 Shaligowraram
 Siripuram
 Solipur
 Sreerangapuram
 Sri Rangapuram
 Suraram
 Surepally
 Swamulavaari Lingotam
 T Repaka
 Tangadapalli
 Tatikal
 Tellabally
 Thallavellamla
 Theratpally
 Thimmapur
 Thipparthy
 Thukkapur
 Thumbavi
 Thungapahad
 Toopranpet
 Tripuraram

U–Y 

 Uppalaphad
 Uthatoor
 Vailasingaram
 Valigonda
 Vallabhapuram
 Veeravelly
 Veliminedu
 Velmakanne
 Venkepally
 Venkiryal
 Venugopalpuram
 Vookondi
 Yadavally

Nalgonda district